Tam-e Mokhtar (also Romanized as Tām-e Mokhtār; also known as Mokhtār) is a village in Sarakhs Rural District, in the Central District of Sarakhs County, Razavi Khorasan Province, Iran. At the 2006 census, its population was 415, in 90 families.

Fravadigan days. This ten-day festival has been mentioned in the Fravadin Yasht and among the Parsees of India it is known as Muktad which is the corrupted version of the word Mokhtar, meaning supreme or important. Thus, the Mukhtad are considered to be important days of the year when prayers are recited in honour of the Fravashis, flowers, fruits and meals are offered during the rituals and consecrated after the ceremony.

References 

Populated places in Sarakhs County